Tourism has affected the development of Northern Cyprus. Its share of the GDP of Northern Cyprus is significant.

In the early 1970s Varosha, Famagusta was the most popular destination in Cyprus, (and popular in the world) before its abandonment in Turkish invasion of Cyprus 1974.

Arrivals by country
Tourists arrivals by country (As of the end of 2012):

Turkey, UK and other northern European countries are the source of most tourist arrivals.

The number of tourists visiting the TRNC during January–August 2006 was 380,000, up from 286,901 during January–August 2003.

The number of tourist beds increased to 17000 in 2011. Tourism revenue in 2011 was USD400 million. The number of tourists visiting Northern Cyprus: January–August 2003: 286,901; January–August 2006: 380,000,; 2010: 437,723

Distribution

 Although there are two airports in Northern Cyprus, the Ercan Airport and Geçitkale Airport, neither have been recognized due to the ongoing disputes involving the political status and recognition of Northern Cyprus. All international flights are done via Turkey by public and private airline companies.

Marina tourism also developed in recent years; Karpaz Gate Marina of Northern Cyprus became a member of ART Marine’s international marinas network in 2014.

Capacity of tourism sector
Annual Tourism Revenues: As of 2012 December:  700 million USD 
Number of night stays: 2003: 1.3 million 2012: 2.7 million
Touristic bed capacity: (2013 March) 19.867
Number of touristic establishments: (2013 March) 145 (Kyrenia: 99). 15 is 5-star-hotel, 6 is 4-star-hotel, 3 is boutique-hotel, 1 is special-certified-hotel. The total number of hotels is 84; Bungalov establishments: 33

Marina tourism
Marina tourism also developed in recent years; many international yacht voyagers come to Northern Cyprus every year.

International memberships of Northern Cyprus and its organizations in tourism
 Karpaz Gate Marina is a member of International Council of Marine Industry Associations (ICOMIA) since 2014.
 Karpaz Gate Marina of Northern Cyprus became a member of ART Marine’s international marinas network in 2014.
 Cyprus Turkish Tourism and Travel Agents Union is a member of United Federation of Travel Agents' Associations (UFTAA). and Global Alliance of Travel Agent Associations (GATAA)

Photo gallery

See also

Climate of Northern Cyprus
History of Northern Cyprus
Economy of Northern Cyprus

References

External links

 
Northern Cyprus
Economy of Northern Cyprus
Northern Cyprus